Lawton Avenue, also known as the Fort Bonifacio–Nichols Field Road, is the main road in Fort Bonifacio, Taguig, Metro Manila, Philippines. It follows a part of the alignment of the old Nichols route running roughly southwest to northeast from Sales Interchange to 5th Avenue and the Manila American Cemetery and Memorial. It was named after Henry Ware Lawton, a US Army general killed during the Philippine–American War.

Route description

Starting at its western terminus at the roundabout intersection with the West Service Road and Sales Road at Sales Interchange in Pasay, the avenue heads east and crosses the South Luzon Expressway and PNR South Main Line railroad tracks. It enters Taguig, where it meets the intersection with Chino Roces Avenue near the entrance to the Fort Andres Bonifacio at Gate 3. It continues across army property winding past the Philippine Naval Hospital and Kagitingan Executive Golf Course, and intersecting with Bayani Road. At Upper McKinley Road, Lawton traverses the McKinley Hill mixed-use development and the Philippine Army Headquarters, bending sharply north as it skirts the western side of Manila American Cemetery. The avenue ends at a fork in the road with 5th Avenue to the west, which leads to Bonifacio Global City, and Old Lawton Road to the east, which leads to the American Cemetery entrance.

The extension of 8th Avenue north of Kalayaan Avenue between Bonifacio Global City and J.P. Rizal Avenue in Makati is also named Lawton Avenue. West of the Nichols interchange, Lawton continues as Sales Road and Andrews Avenue heading towards Pasay, the Villamor Air Base, and Ninoy Aquino International Airport.

Expansion
As part of the Duterte administration's Build! Build! Build! Infrastructure Program, the avenue was expanded from four lanes (two lanes per direction) to six lanes (three lanes per direction). The project spans  and is divided in two phases. The road widening project complemented with the construction of the Santa Monica-Lawton Bridge and the expected influx of vehicles once the Santa Monica-Lawton bridge is opened. When completed, the travel time between Bonifacio Global City and Ninoy Aquino International Airport will be reduced by about 40% and the road will accommodate more vehicles. Construction began on August 21, 2017 and the first phase spanning  was opened on November 17, 2020. The road widening project is expected to be fully completed in September 2021.

Landmarks

 Bonifacio Heights
 Fort Andres Bonifacio
 Gate 3 Plaza
 Kagitingan Executive Golf Course
 Manila American Cemetery and Memorial
 McKinley Hill
 McKinley West
 National Mapping and Resource Information Authority
 Philippine Army Headquarters
 Philippine Marine Corps Headquarters
 Philippine Navy Naval Station
 Southern Police District Headquarters

References

Streets in Metro Manila